Manching is a municipality in the district of Pfaffenhofen, in Bavaria, Germany. It is situated on the river Paar, 7 km southeast of Ingolstadt. In the late Iron Age, there was a Celtic settlement, the Oppidum of Manching, on the location of present-day Manching.

Airbus Defence and Space (former Military Air Systems business unit of EADS) has its flight test center here at Manching Airport.

The Barthelmarkt, a well-known beer festival in the area, takes place in the district of Oberstimm on the last weekend of August every year.

References

Pfaffenhofen (district)